The GiMA Best Film Song is given by Global Indian Music Academy as a part of its annual Global Indian Music Academy Awards to recognise Hindi film songs.

List of winners
 2010 Iktara – Wake Up Sid
 2011 "Pee Loon" – Once Upon A Time In Mumbaai
 "Ainvayi Ainvayi" - Band Baaja Baaraat
 "Munni Badnaam Hui" - Dabangg
 "Sheila Ki Jawani" - Tees Maar Khan
 "Tere Mast Mast Do Nain" - Dabangg
 2012 "Chammak Challo" – Ra.One
 "Ishq Sufiyana" - The Dirty Picture
 "Nadaan Parinde" - Rockstar
 "Señorita" - Zindagi Na Milegi Dobara
 "Subha Hone Na De" - Desi Boyz
 "Teri Meri" - Bodyguard
 2013 – (no award given)
 2014 "Tum Hi Ho" – Aashiqui 2
 "Badtameez Dil" - Yeh Jawaani Hai Deewani
 "Chahu Main Ya Na" - Aashiqui 2
 "Lungi Dance" - Chennai Express
 "Sawaar Loon" - Lootera
 "Sunn Raha Hai" - Aashiqui 2
 2015 "London Thumakda" – Queen
 "Baby Doll" - Ragini MMS 2
 "Galliyan" - Ek Villain
 "Mast Magan" - 2 States
 "Tu Meri" - Bang Bang!
 2016 "Gerua" - Dilwale
 "Agar Tum saath Ho" – Tamasha
 "Pinga" - Bajirao Mastani
 "Sooraj Dooba Hain" - Roy
 "Moh Moh Ke Dhaage" - Dum Laga Ke Haisha
 2020 "Apna Time Ayega" - Gully Boy
 "Munna Badnaam Hua" – Dabangg 3
 "Dheeme Dheeme" - Pati Patni Aur Woh
 "Don't Be Shy" - Bala
 "Makhna" - Drive

See also
 Bollywood
 Cinema of India

References

Global Indian Music Academy Awards